Loprieno is a surname. Notable people with the surname include: 

 Antonio Loprieno (born 1955), Swiss Italian Egyptologist
 John Loprieno (born 1960), American actor and writer